Media in Dundee has been an integral part of the city's history, particularly print media. Dundee has long been known for its Jute, Jam & Journalism, with the latter the only remaining industry of the three still present in the city. The city and surrounding area's main newspaper The Courier has been a fixture of Dundee life, still printed in the city, since 1801.

Dundee also has a number of regional radio stations and has local production facilities for the BBC and STV.

Newspaper
The main newspapers of Dundee are The Courier (daily) and the Evening Telegraph, both printed six days a week by D. C. Thomson & Co. Ltd. The free newspaper Metro and a local edition of the Record PM are widely available in the city. Dundee is also home to one of Scotland's most popular Sunday papers, the Sunday Post, and
various magazines such as The People's Friend and children's comics, such as The Beano. Former comics published in Dundee include The Dandy.

Television
For over forty years, Grampian Television maintained a base in Dundee for newsgathering and advertising sales purposes, covering Tayside and north east Fife. Since January 2007, the station (now known as STV North) has produced and broadcast a nightly opt-out bulletin for the area, within the regional news programme STV News at Six - originally from studios in Harbour Chambers and since 2008, from expanded facilities at Seabraes.

BBC Scotland also have a base in Dundee's city centre. BBC Dundee is mainly used for news operations for both television and radio services.

For a few years, Dundee was also home to its own Restricted Service Licence television channel Channel Six Dundee.

Local radio
The city is the base for two commercial radio companies; Radio Tay, which has two stations, Tay FM and Tay 2, and Wave 102. Dundee also has a base for BBC Scotland's radio service Radio Scotland. Due to its close proximity to the Central Belt, it is also possible in Dundee to receive Heart Scotland, Capital FM Scotland, Kingdom FM and Forth 1.

External links
 DC Thomson Official Site
 BBC Tayside & Central
 Wave 102 Official Site
 Radio Tay Official Site

Mass media in Dundee
Dundee